Kevelaer (Low Rhenish: Käwela) is a town in the district of Kleve, in North Rhine-Westphalia in Germany. It is the largest Catholic pilgrimage location within north-western Europe. More than 1 million pilgrims, mostly from Germany and the Netherlands, visit Kevelaer every year to honour the Virgin Mary. The population in 2019 was 28,021.

History

Kevelaer is a center of veneration and pilgrimage to Our Lady, Comforter of the Afflicted (also known as Our Lady of Consolation. According to tradition, a merchant named Hendrik Busman, in the days before Christmas, 1641, three times heard a voice saying "Here thou shalt build me a chapel". He began to set money aside but feared his wife, Mechel, wouldn't approve. She, however, had a vision, around Pentecost, in which she saw a little chapel containing a print of Our Lady of Consolation, all bathed in light. The story was confirmed by two passing soldiers, who saw the house light up at night. Days before, two soldiers had tried to sell her two copperplate engravings with the same image on it, but she found it too expensive. Hendrik began building the chapel while Mechel tried to obtain the print. The chapel was consecrated and on 1 June 1642, the Sunday after Assumption of Mary, the print was displayed in it, and the chapel became such a popular destination for pilgrims that a church was built for them between 1643 and 1645. The little chapel was replaced in 1654 with a larger one, the Gnadenkapelle, which still houses the print.

It is one of the best visited Catholic pilgrimage locations in north-western Europe. The Gnadenkapelle (Chapel of Mercy) has drawn pilgrims to the Lower Rhine Region from all over the world for more than 360 years. Pope John Paul II visited in 1987.

Twin towns – sister cities

Kevelaer is twinned with:
 Bury St Edmunds, England, United Kingdom

Notable people
Franz-Peter Tebartz-van Elst (born 1959), prelate of the Catholic Church and theologian
Markus Meurer (born 1959), outsider artist

Gallery

References

External links
 
“Build Me A Chapel On This Spot”

 

Kleve (district)
Catholic pilgrimage sites